Club Rubio Ñu is a Paraguayan football club based in the Barrio Santísima Trinidad of Asunción. The club was founded August 24, 1913 and plays in the División Intermedia, the second division of the Paraguayan football league. Their home games are played at the Estadio La Arboleda which has a capacity of approximately 8,000 seats.

History
The club was founded in 1913 by a group of young friends that chose white and green as the colors in representation of "purity" and "hope", respectively. After its foundation Rubio Ñu joined the rebel league "Liga Centenario", which was created by some clubs that had disagreements with the Paraguayan football association (APF) which was in charge of organizing the main league, the Liga Paraguaya. Some 23 years after its foundation, two others clubs from the same Santísima Trinidad neighborhood (Club Itá Ybaté and Club Flor de Mayo) merged with Rubio Ñu. Sportivo Trinidense (which is also from the same neighborhood) is the club's main rival.

After the Liga Centenario disappeared, they were back in the lower divisions of the Liga Paraguaya until finally in 1926 they won the second division and made their way to the first division. Since then, Rubio Ñu has been relegated and promoted between the third, second and first division several times. Most recently in 2008, they won the second division tournament for the 7th time in their history under the coaching of Francisco Arce and made it to the top-flight of Paraguayan football in 2009.

Honours
Paraguayan Second Division: 7
1926, 1941, 1954, 1961, 1963, 1972, 2008

Paraguayan Third Division: 3
1941, 1942, 2005

Current squad

Notable players
To appear in this section a player must have either:
 Played at least 125 games for the club.
 Set a club record or won an individual award while at the club.
 Been part of a national team at any time.
 Played in the first division of any other football association (outside of Paraguay).
 Played in a continental and/or intercontinental competition.

2010's
 Josías Paulo Cardoso Júnior (2012)
Non-CONMEBOL players
Ninguno

References

External links

Official Website
Club Rubio Ňú Info

 
Football clubs in Paraguay
Football clubs in Asunción
Association football clubs established in 1913
1913 establishments in Paraguay